Barão de Iguape Building is a skyscraper in the older area of downtown São Paulo, Brazil,  in height with 37 floors, located on Patriarca square on the corner of Direita and Quitanda streets. Its construction was completed in 1959.

The building was for years the headquarters of a bank, Unibanco, but this was transferred to another building on the Marginal Pinheiros expressway, next to Eusébio Matoso bridge in the southwestern neighborhood of Pinheiros.

See also

Mirante do Vale
Altino Arantes Building

Skyscrapers in São Paulo
Skyscraper office buildings in Brazil

Office buildings completed in 1959